The Bureau of Customs Transformers is a basketball team currently competing in the UNTV Cup Season 5. The Transformers are the newest team to be participate in the UNTV Cup, a public service-based basketball tournament in the Philippines. The team was supported by BOC Commissioners Nicanor Faeldon, that aims to beef up the bureau's campaign on the image transformation to the public from being the corrupted and controversial government agency to one of the most-efficient and transparent agencies to date.

The team's roster will be reinforced by PBA legend and former Senate Defenders player Kenneth Duremdes as their playing coach, together with former PBA players Marlou Aquino and Gherome Ejercito.

On September 11, 2016, the Transformers won their first assignment against GSIS Furies, 76-74, in their encounter held at the Pasig City Sports Center. Aquino led the team's top scorers with 12 points.

Aside from the basketball team, a volleyball team also called as the BOC Transformers was introduced in the 13th Shakey's V-League Reinforced Conference.

See also
Bureau of Customs

References

Basketball teams established in 2016
UNTV Cup